is a major railway interchange station in Arakawa, Tokyo, Japan. It is also adjacent to the Yanaka neighborhood of Taito district.

Lines
East Japan Railway Company (JR East)
Joban Line (Rapid)
Keihin-Tohoku Line
Yamanote Line
Keisei Electric Railway
Keisei Main Line
Toei
Nippori-Toneri Liner

The station is an intersection of JR and Keisei systems. Although Keisei Ueno Station, the terminal of Keisei, is also located adjacent to JR East's Ueno Station, Nippori Station provides easier transfer.

Platforms

Keisei platforms

A new elevated platform serving outbound Keisei trains opened to traffic on October 3, 2009. The new elevated line has two side platforms serving a single track. One platform is for Skyliner, Cityliner, and Eveningliner boarding, while the other platform is for regular commuter trains. Ueno-bound trains continue to discharge on the original platform on the lower level.

JR platforms
There are no platforms for tracks 5 to 8, which are for non-stop Takasaki Line and Utsunomiya Line trains.

Nippori-Toneri platforms
The Nippori-Toneri Liner station is elevated and consists of a single island platform serving two tracks.

History
The JR station first opened on 1 April 1905. The Keisei station opened on 19 December 1931.

A new elevated platform for Keisei services opened on 3 October 2009. Station numbering was introduced to all Keisei Line stations on 17 June 2010 with Nippori being assigned station number KS02. 

Station numbering was introduced in 2016 with Nippori being assigned station numbers JY07 for the Yamanote line, JK32 for the Keihin-Tōhoku line, and JJ02 for the Joban Line rapid service. At the same time, JR East assigned a three-letter code to their major interchange station; Nippori was assigned the three-letter code "NPR". Station numbering was expanded to the Nippori-Toneri Liner platforms in November 2017 with the station receiving station number NT02.

Passenger statistics
In fiscal 2013, the JR East station was used by an average of 102,817 passengers daily (boarding passengers only), making it the 37th-busiest station operated by JR East. In fiscal 2013, the Keisei station was used by an average of 96,428 passengers per day (exiting and entering passengers), making it the third-busiest station operated by Keisei. Over the same fiscal year, the Toei station was used by an average of 20,421 per day (boarding passengers only), making it the busiest station on the Nippori-Toneri Liner. The daily average passenger figures (boarding passengers only) for the JR East station in previous years are as shown below.

Surrounding area
 Yanaka Cemetery
 Yanaka-Ginza Shopping District
 Yūyake-dandan Stairs
 Fujimizaka Hill
 Tokyo Women's Medical University Medical Center East

Connecting bus services
Toei Bus operates local bus services from the following Nippori Station bus stops.

See also

 List of railway stations in Japan

References

External links

 JR East station information 
 Keisei Nippori Station diagram

Railway stations in Tokyo
Railway stations in Japan opened in 1905
Yamanote Line
Keihin-Tōhoku Line
Jōban Line
Keisei Main Line
Stations of East Japan Railway Company
Stations of Keisei Electric Railway
Nippori-Toneri Liner
Arakawa, Tokyo